Bruford Levin Upper Extremities is a self-titled album by the band Bruford Levin Upper Extremities. It is their only studio recording, released on Tony Levin's independent label Papa Bear Records. Formed by bassist Levin and drummer Bill Bruford (who had worked together as the rhythm section of King Crimson), the group also included guitarist David Torn and trumpeter Chris Botti. Torn, Bruford and Levin had recorded together on Torn's album Cloud About Mercury ten years before this.

Reception

In a review for The Washington Post, Mike Joyce described the album as "an unusually large and colorful musical mosaic," stating that it "alludes, intentionally or not, to a lot of pop, rock and jazz musicians and bands." He concluded: "for all the album's obvious reference points, the musicians are too stubbornly willful to fall into any groove for long."

S. Victor Aaron of Something Else! praised the track titled "Cracking the Midnight Glass," calling it "a mash-up of contrasting styles that's like the cherry on a sundae for those who like these collisions of genres. I know I do."

Writing for Exposé Online, Jeff Melton called the album a "remarkable work led by possibly one of the best rhythm sections in modern music," and commented: "Although not as dark as any Crimson recording, B.L.U.E. is a shining ring on the challenging clasp where rock meets jazz."

Track listing 

 "Cerulean Sea" – 7:03
 "Interlude" – 0:23
 "Original Sin" – 4:55
 "Etude Revisited" – 4:57
 "A Palace of Pearls (On a Blade of Grass)" – 5:33
 "Interlude" – 0:19
 "Fin de Siècle" – 5:22
 "Drumbass" – 0:54
 "Cracking the Midnight Glass" – 6:06
 "Torn Drumbass" – 0:54
 "Thick With Thin Air" – 3:28
 "Cobalt Canyons" – 3:53
 "Interlude" – 0:27
 "Deeper Blue" – 4:12
 "Presidents Day" – 6:22

Personnel
Bruford Levin Upper Extremities
 Bill Bruford — drums, percussion, keyboards
 Chris Botti — trumpet
 Tony Levin — bass guitar, Chapman Stick
 David Torn — guitars, loops

Production
Tony Levin – producer
Tom Mark – engineer
Bill Bruford, Tony Levin, Tom Mark – mixing
Bob Ludwig – mastering
Megan Denver, Tony Levin – artwork, photography

References

1998 debut albums
Bruford Levin Upper Extremities albums
Discipline Global Mobile albums